The Bitfinex cryptocurrency exchange was hacked in August 2016. 119,756 bitcoin, worth about  million at the time, were stolen.

In February 2022, the US government recovered and seized a portion of the stolen bitcoin, then worth  billion, by decrypting a file owned by Ilya Lichtenstein that contained addresses and private keys associated with the stolen funds. Lichtenstein and his wife, Heather R. Morgan, were charged with conspiracy to launder money.

Hack 
In August 2016, the Bitfinex cryptocurrency exchange, based in Hong Kong, announced it had suffered a security breach. Around 2,000 approved transactions were sent to a single wallet from users' segregated wallets. Immediately thereafter, Bitcoin's trading price plunged by 20%, causing the value of the stolen Bitcoin to dip to  million. After learning of the breach, Bitfinex halted all Bitcoin withdrawals and trading and said it was tracking down the hack. Exchange customers, even those whose accounts had not been broken into, had their account balance reduced by 36% and received BFX tokens in proportion to their losses. The exchange's access to U.S. dollar payments and withdrawals was then curtailed. The hack happened even though Bitfinex was securing the funds with BitGo, which uses multiple-signature security.

Laundering
Small amounts of money began to move out of the single wallet in early 2017 through the marketplace AlphaBay to launder it. After AlphaBay was shuttered by international law enforcement led by the FBI, the money was rerouted to the Russian marketplace Hydra. The shutdown of AlphaBay may have given law enforcement access to the service's internal transaction logs to connect pieces together.

In February 2022, a New York couple, Ilya Lichtenstein (age 34) and his wife Heather R. Morgan (age 31), were charged by US federal authorities with conspiring to launder the bitcoin, which was then worth  billion. If found guilty, each of the pair faces a maximum sentence of 20 years in prison for the alleged conspiracy to launder money, and a maximum sentence of five years for the alleged conspiracy to defraud the United States. Neither were accused of perpetrating the hack. Law enforcement were able to acquire a search warrant for a cloud storage service used by Lichtenstein, obtaining a spreadsheet of wallet addresses linked to the hack, and their passwords. One of the wallets had around 94,000 Bitcoin. Due to the openness and transparency of the blockchain, law enforcement was able to track the money; and obtaining the passwords allowed them to seize it.

Some of the funds were moved towards more traditional financial accounts and used on gold, NFTs, and a Walmart gift card spent on Uber rides and a PlayStation. Though hundreds of millions of dollars were converted to fiat currency, 80% of the Bitcoin were still in the original wallet at the center of the hack.

Shortly after the couple's arrest, Netflix ordered a documentary series that will cover the story of Lichtenstein's and Morgan's alleged crimes.

See also
 History of bitcoin

References

Cryptocurrency theft
Money laundering
Robberies in the United States
Hacking in the 2010s
Bitfinex hack
Bitfinex hack